Apollonides was a Greek physician and surgeon from Cos. Like many other of his kinsmen, he went to serve at the court of the Persian Empire, then ruled by Artaxerxes Longimanus (465–425 BC).

At the court he cured Megabyzus, the king's brother-in-law, of a dangerous wound, but was afterwards engaged in a sinful and scandalous amour with his wife, Amytis, who was herself a most profligate woman. For this offence Apollonides was given up by Artaxerxes into the hands of his mother, Amestris, who tortured him for about two months, and at last, upon the death of her daughter, ordered him to be buried alive.

Notes

References
Brosius, M (1998): Women in Ancient Persia, pp. 73, 74, 113, 114.

5th-century BC Greek physicians
Ancient Koans
Ancient Greek emigrants to the Achaemenid Empire
Year of birth missing
Year of death missing
Executed ancient Greek people
5th-century BC executions
People executed by the Achaemenid Empire
Ancient torture victims
Physicians of the Achaemenid Empire